Kirwee is a town located west of Christchurch in the Canterbury region of New Zealand's South Island.  It was named after Karwi in India by retired British Army colonel De Renzie Brett. Kirwee is also home to the South Island Agricultural Field Days, held biennially.

History 

In the early 1870s, Kirwee was intended to be the junction of two branch lines, one to Whitecliffs and the other to Sheffield and Springfield.  The line from Kirwee to Darfield, intended to be the first portion of the Whitecliffs Branch, was built first and the decision was taken to establish the junction of the two branches in Darfield instead. The section of line from Kirwee to Darfield, as well as the branch to Sheffield and Springfield are now part of the Midland Line.

On 25 December 2019, the historic pub was gutted by a fire. It was demolished in May 2020.

Demographics
It is part of the Kirwee statistical area.

Kirwee settlement had a population of 966 at the 2018 New Zealand census, an increase of 198 people (25.8%) since the 2013 census, and an increase of 363 people (60.2%) since the 2006 census. There were 354 households. There were 495 males and 474 females, giving a sex ratio of 1.04 males per female, with 204 people (21.1%) aged under 15 years, 129 (13.4%) aged 15 to 29, 510 (52.8%) aged 30 to 64, and 135 (14.0%) aged 65 or older.

Ethnicities were 96.9% European/Pākehā, 4.0% Māori, 0.6% Pacific peoples, 1.2% Asian, and 2.8% other ethnicities (totals add to more than 100% since people could identify with multiple ethnicities).

Although some people objected to giving their religion, 53.1% had no religion, 34.8% were Christian, 0.3% were Hindu and 1.9% had other religions.

Of those at least 15 years old, 153 (20.1%) people had a bachelor or higher degree, and 126 (16.5%) people had no formal qualifications. The employment status of those at least 15 was that 450 (59.1%) people were employed full-time, 120 (15.7%) were part-time, and 18 (2.4%) were unemployed.

Kirwee statistical area

The statistical area had a population of 1,275 at the 2018 New Zealand census, an increase of 174 people (15.8%) since the 2013 census, and an increase of 357 people (38.9%) since the 2006 census. There were 474 households. There were 648 males and 627 females, giving a sex ratio of 1.03 males per female. The median age was 42.2 years (compared with 37.4 years nationally), with 264 people (20.7%) aged under 15 years, 171 (13.4%) aged 15 to 29, 666 (52.2%) aged 30 to 64, and 171 (13.4%) aged 65 or older.

Ethnicities were 96.7% European/Pākehā, 4.9% Māori, 0.5% Pacific peoples, 1.4% Asian, and 2.1% other ethnicities (totals add to more than 100% since people could identify with multiple ethnicities).

The proportion of people born overseas was 16.0%, compared with 27.1% nationally.

Although some people objected to giving their religion, 52.9% had no religion, 36.0% were Christian, 0.2% were Hindu, 0.2% were Muslim and 2.1% had other religions.

Of those at least 15 years old, 213 (21.1%) people had a bachelor or higher degree, and 156 (15.4%) people had no formal qualifications. The median income was $44,800, compared with $31,800 nationally. The employment status of those at least 15 was that 594 (58.8%) people were employed full-time, 159 (15.7%) were part-time, and 21 (2.1%) were unemployed.

Transport 
State Highway 73 and the Midland Line railway both pass through the town. Kirwee is also serviced with the 86 bus route.

Education
Kirwee Model School is a contributing primary school catering for years 1 to 6.

References

External links
Information about Kirwee

Selwyn District
Populated places in Canterbury, New Zealand